Ritipenem is a penem class antimicrobial agent. Ritipenem is manufactured by Tanabe Seiyaku in the ritipenem acoxil prodrug form, which can be taken orally . It is not FDA approved in the United States as of 2008.

References

 

Antibiotics